Oxyceros is a genus of climbing flowering plants in the tribe Gardenieae of the family Rubiaceae. The 12 species are native to Asia from Sri Lanka to Malesia.

References

Rubiaceae genera
Gardenieae